Monika Bociek (born 6 April 1996) is a Polish volleyball player, a member of Poland women's national volleyball team U23 and Polish club LTS Legionovia Legionowo

Personal life
Monika Bociek has a three older brothers - Łukasz, who played volleyball in past, but went to seminary, Piotr and Grzegorz, who is also volleyball player and plays as an opposite hitter in Poland men's national volleyball team and ZAKSA Kędzierzyn-Koźle.

Career

Clubs
In 2014, she moved from Sparta Warszawa to club of ORLEN Liga - LTS Legionovia Legionowo.

National team
In 2013, she was in Poland women's junior national team at EEVZA Junior Championship.

Sporting achievements

Clubs

National championship
 2014/2015  Polish Championship U23, with LTS Legionovia Legionowo

References

External links
 ORLEN Liga player profile

1996 births
Living people
Polish women's volleyball players
Place of birth missing (living people)